Benjamin John Morgan (born 18 February 1989) is an England international rugby union player currently plays at number eight for Gloucester.

Morgan scored his first try for the Scarlets on 22 April 2011 against Glasgow Warriors.

Morgan went to Kingswood Primary School, Gloucestershire and Katharine Lady Berkeley's Secondary School. Morgan played junior rugby at Dursley RFC.

In June 2011, Morgan turned down the chance to play for England Saxons in the Churchill Cup. If he had played for the Saxons, he would not have been allowed to opt for Wales. On 4 January 2012, Morgan made the decision to make himself available to play international rugby for England. He had been due to qualify for Wales (having lived there for three years) in time for the 2012 Six Nations Championship. Morgan said the choice was a personal one, on the basis that he was born and bred in England.

On 11 January 2012, Morgan was named in the England training squad for the 2012 Six Nations Championship.

Morgan made his debut for England on 4 February 2012, coming on as a second-half replacement against Scotland in the 2012 Six Nations Championship. He played in all five of the six nations games, receiving the man of the match award in the final match against Ireland.

On 4 March 2012, Morgan signed for his boyhood club Gloucester Rugby from the Scarlets.

International career

International tries

References

External links

Llanelli profile
Scarlets Player Profile
Gloucester Rugby profile

1989 births
Living people
Rugby union players from Bristol
English rugby union players
Scarlets players
England international rugby union players
People educated at Katharine Lady Berkeley's School
Merthyr RFC players
Rugby union number eights